"(The Lights Went Out In) Massachusetts" is a song by the Bee Gees, written by Barry, Robin & Maurice Gibb and released in 1967. Robin Gibb sang lead vocals on this song and it would become one of his staple songs to perform during both Bee Gees concerts and his solo appearances. It later appeared on their 1968 album, Horizontal.

The song became the first of the group's five No. 1 hits in the UK Singles Chart, reached No. 1 in twelve other countries, peaked at No. 11 on the Billboard Hot 100 and eventually sold over five million copies worldwide. When the brothers wrote the song, they had never been to Massachusetts. In a UK television special on ITV in December 2011, it was voted third (behind "How Deep Is Your Love" and "You Win Again") in "The Nation's Favourite Bee Gees Song".

Writing and inspiration
The song was written in the Regis Hotel, New York City during a tour of the United States. The song was intended as an antithesis to flower power anthems of the time such as "Let's Go to San Francisco" and "San Francisco (Be Sure to Wear Flowers in Your Hair)" in that the protagonist had been to San Francisco to join the hippies but was now homesick. The idea of the lights having gone out in Massachusetts was to suggest that everyone had gone to San Francisco.

The song was originally intended for The Seekers. Upon arriving in London from Australia (following in the path of the Seekers, who had arrived several years earlier) the Bee Gees had been unsuccessful in getting the song to the group, so they recorded it themselves. During a chance meeting in London between the Seekers' lead singer Judith Durham and Maurice Gibb, Durham learned that "Massachusetts" was originally intended for her group and in 2003 the Seekers recorded the song as a tribute to Maurice following his death earlier that year.

The Bee Gees had never actually been to Massachusetts when they recorded the song; they just liked the sound of the name as it was unusual, containing a lot of S's.

Recording
"Massachusetts" was recorded on 9 August 1967, along with "Sir Geoffrey Saved the World", at the IBC Studios in London and finished on 17 August. Barry feels Bill Shepherd's orchestral score is perhaps the arranger's finest: "We never expected him to do that. Sometimes we would sing what we would [imagine] the strings doing. But in this case he did that himself, and I thought it was great. 'Massachusetts' was our first #1 in England".

Release
Before the release of this song, Australians Colin Petersen and Vince Melouney were facing deportation, and it appeared that they might have to leave the band as a result. On 12 August, British fans staged a protest on behalf of the musicians at the cottage of Prime Minister Harold Wilson. Three days later Bee Gees fan Deirdre Meehan chained and handcuffed herself to Buckingham Palace to protest the possible deportation. Ultimately, the musicians were allowed to stay.

On 27 August 1967, Beatles' manager Brian Epstein told Maurice Gibb that "'Massachusetts' is a great song that would be very successful." Epstein died later that night.

When it was released in the UK, the title was "Massachusetts (The Lights Went Out in)" but the subtitle was later dropped. In America, Atco Records delayed it to release "Holiday".  The song "Massachusetts" has a minor claim to fame in the history of British radio as it was the second record played on BBC Radio 1. The first song to be played was "Flowers in the Rain" by The Move. It was the first No. 1 hit single by a non-Japanese artist on Japan's official hit chart, Oricon Singles Chart, on 1 April 1968, and would end up as the band's biggest selling single there.

Cash Box said that it is "a splendidly arranged ballad somewhat in the Scott McKenzie bag."

Personnel
Robin Gibb – lead vocals
Barry Gibb – rhythm guitar, harmony vocals
Maurice Gibb – bass guitar, piano, Mellotron, harmony vocals
Vince Melouney – rhythm guitar
Colin Petersen – drums
Bill Shepherd – orchestral arrangement

Charts

Weekly charts

Year-end charts

Notable cover versions
Yugoslav rock band Siluete recorded a version of the song in 1967 for the Yugoslav TV show Koncert za ludi mladi svet (A Concert for Young Crazy World). The video for the song eas shot in the Wild West town settings in the Avala Film Studios.
The Seekers recorded this song following the death of Maurice Gibb.
Rita Wilson and Leslie Odom, Jr. covered the song in 2022 for Wilson's album Rita Wilson Now & Forever: Duets

References

Bee Gees songs
1967 songs
1967 singles
UK Singles Chart number-one singles
Number-one singles in Germany
Oricon Weekly number-one singles
Number-one singles in New Zealand
Number-one singles in Norway
Number-one singles in South Africa
Number-one singles in Sweden
Songs about the United States
Songs written by Barry Gibb
Songs written by Maurice Gibb
Songs written by Robin Gibb
Song recordings produced by Robert Stigwood
Song recordings produced by Barry Gibb
Song recordings produced by Robin Gibb
Song recordings produced by Maurice Gibb
Polydor Records singles
Atco Records singles